The following passenger trains have been called the Gotham Limited:
The Gotham Limited (PRR train), operated by the Pennsylvania Railroad from 1922 to 1956
The Gotham Limited (Amtrak train), operated by Amtrak from 1997 to 1999